She's No Angel is a 2001 television film directed and written by Rachel Feldman, loosely  based on the novel I Married a Dead Man by Cornell Woolrich.

Plot
Donald (Kevin Dobson) and Maureen (Dee Wallace) are a married couple who get horrible news: their son was involved in a car accident and has died. Liddy (Tracey Gold), his wife, has never met Donald and Maureen. Despite that, they take her in, because she is all alone. They soon discover she is not an angel to live with.

Cast
 Tracey Gold as Liddy Carlyle
 Kevin Dobson as Donald Shawnessy
 Dee Wallace as Maureen Shawnessy
 Cameron Bancroft as Jed Benton
 Jeffrey Meek as Jackie Furst
 Michelle Jones as Catherine Shawnessy
 Nathan Anderson as Sean Shawnessy

2001 television films
2001 films
American television films
2000s English-language films